Harold J. Dahl (April 27, 1930 – February 20, 1989) was an American politician and judge.

Dahl was born in Duluth, Minnesota and graduated from Duluth Central High School. He served in the United States Navy during the Korean War. Dahl went to Northwestern University and University of Minnesota Law School. Dahl was admitted to the Minnesota bar. He lived in Howard Lake, Minnesota with his wife and family. Dahl served on the Howard Lake School Board and was a Democrat. He served in the Minnesota House of Representatives from 1973 to 1977. In 1977, he was appointed district court judge for Wright County, Minnesota. Dahl died from cancer at the Riverside Medical Hospice in Minneapolis, Minnesota.

References

1930 births
1989 deaths
Politicians from Duluth, Minnesota
People from Wright County, Minnesota
Northwestern University alumni
University of Minnesota alumni
Military personnel from Minnesota
Minnesota lawyers
Minnesota state court judges
School board members in Minnesota
Democratic Party members of the Minnesota House of Representatives
Deaths from cancer in Minnesota